1965 in sports describes the year's events in world sport.

American football
 NFL Championship: the Green Bay Packers won 23–12 over the Cleveland Browns at Lambeau Field
 The game was pushed to January 2, 1966, due to a Western Conference tie–breaker (Green Bay 13, Baltimore 10) on December 26, 1965
 Orange Bowl (1964 season):
 The Alabama Crimson Tide lose 21–17 to the Texas Longhorns; still named AP & UPI national champions
 AFL Championship  – Buffalo Bills win 23–0 over the San Diego Chargers

Association football

England
 FA Cup final – Liverpool won 2-1 (aet) versus Leeds United

Australian rules football
 Victorian Football League
 Essendon wins the 69th VFL Premiership (Essendon 14.21 (105) d St Kilda 9.16 (70))
 Brownlow Medal awarded to Ian Stewart (St Kilda) and Noel Teasdale (North Melbourne)

Bandy
 1965 Bandy World Championship is won by host nation .

Baseball
 Houston Colt .45's change name to Houston Astros, and Los Angeles Angels change name to California Angels.
 World Series – Los Angeles Dodgers win 4 games to 3 over the Minnesota Twins
 Venezuelan professional baseball club, Tigres de Aragua officially founded in Maracay on October 15.

Basketball
 NCAA Men's Basketball Championship – UCLA Bruins win 91–80 over the Michigan Wolverines
 NBA Finals – Boston Celtics win 4 games to 1 over the Los Angeles Lakers
 Taca Brasil de Basquete, as predecessor for Campeonato Brasileiro de Basquete, a first official game held on November 26 in Brazil.

Boxing
 March 30 – José Torres won the Light Heavyweight Championship of the World, stopping Willie Pastrano in nine rounds, at New York City's Madison Square Garden.

Canadian football
 Grey Cup – Hamilton Tiger-Cats win 22–16 over the Winnipeg Blue Bombers
 Vanier Cup – Toronto Varsity Blues win 14–7 over the Alberta Golden Bears
 Canadian Junior Championship – Notre-Dame-de-Grace Maple Leafs win 2–1 over the Edmonton Huskies

Cricket
 Imperial Cricket Conference is renamed to International Cricket Conference and new rules are adopted to permit the election of countries from outside the Commonwealth of Nations.

Cue sports (pool, snooker, carom billiards)
 The World Five-pins Championship is inaugurated in Santa Fé, Argentina – Manuel Gomez (of Argentina) takes the title.

Cycling
 Giro d'Italia won by Vittorio Adorni of Italy
 Tour de France – Felice Gimondi of Italy
 UCI Road World Championships – Men's road race – Tom Simpson of Great Britain

Field Hockey
 March 13 – In an international women's field hockey match at Wembley Stadium, England. South Africa beat England 2–1.

Figure skating
 World Figure Skating Championships
 Men's champion: Alain Calmat, France
 Ladies' champion: Petra Burka, Canada
 Pair skating champions: Ludmila Belousova & Oleg Protopopov, Soviet Union
 Ice dancing champions: Eva Romanová & Pavel Roman, Czechoslovakia

Golf
Men's professional
 Masters Tournament – Jack Nicklaus shoots a Masters record 271 (17 under par) to win by nine strokes.
 U.S. Open – Gary Player becomes the third golfer in history to win all four professional majors.
 British Open – Peter Thomson
 PGA Championship – Dave Marr
 PGA Tour money leader – Jack Nicklaus – $140,752
 Ryder Cup – United States wins 19½ to 12½ over Britain in team golf.
Men's amateur
 British Amateur – Michael Bonallack
 U.S. Amateur – Bob Murphy
Women's professional
 Women's Western Open – Susie Maxwell
 LPGA Championship – Sandra Haynie
 U.S. Women's Open – Carol Mann
 Titleholders Championship – Kathy Whitworth
 LPGA Tour money leader – Kathy Whitworth – $28,658

Harness racing
 Bret Hanover wins the United States Pacing Triple Crown races –
 Cane Pace – Bret Hanover
 Little Brown Jug – Bret Hanover
 Messenger Stakes – Bret Hanover
 United States Trotting Triple Crown races –
 Hambletonian – Egyptian Candor
 Yonkers Trot – Noble Victory
 Kentucky Futurity – Armbro Flight
 Australian Inter Dominion Harness Racing Championship –
 Pacers: Jay Ar
 Trotters: Poupette

Horse racing
Steeplechases
 Cheltenham Gold Cup – Arkle
 Grand National – Jay Trump
Flat races
 Australia – Melbourne Cup won by Light Fingers
 Canada – Queen's Plate won by Whistling Sea
 France – Prix de l'Arc de Triomphe won by Sea Bird
 Ireland – Irish Derby Stakes won by Meadow Court
 English Triple Crown Races:
 2,000 Guineas Stakes – Niksar
 The Derby – Sea Bird
 St. Leger Stakes – Provoke
 United States Triple Crown Races:
 Kentucky Derby – Lucky Debonair
 Preakness Stakes – Tom Rolfe
 Belmont Stakes – Hail To All

Ice hockey
 Art Ross Trophy as the NHL's leading scorer during the regular season: Stan Mikita, Chicago Black Hawks
 Hart Memorial Trophy for the NHL's Most Valuable Player: Bobby Hull, Chicago Black Hawks
 Stanley Cup – Montreal Canadiens win 4 games to 3 over the Chicago Black Hawks
 World Hockey Championship – Soviet Union defeats Czechoslovakia
 NCAA Men's Ice Hockey Championship – Michigan Technological University Huskies defeat Boston College Eagles 8–2 in Providence, Rhode Island

Motorsport

Pickleball
 The game of Pickleball is invented on  Bainbridge Island, Washington.

Radiosport
 Fourth Amateur Radio Direction Finding European Championship held in Warsaw, Poland.

Rugby league
1965 New Zealand rugby league season
1965 NSWRFL season: St George wins the tenth of a record eleven consecutive premierships in the NSWRL. They were not to win again until 1977, then in 1979 which was their last premiership before their 1999 merger with the Illawarra Steelers.
1964–65 Northern Rugby Football League season / 1965–66 Northern Rugby Football League season

Rugby union
 71st Five Nations Championship series is won by Wales

Snooker
 World Snooker Championship challenge matches:
 John Pulman beats Fred Davis 37-36
 John Pulman beats Rex Williams 25-22
 John Pulman beats Fred Van Rensburg 39-12

Swimming
 1 March – The Amateur Swimming Union of Australia stuns the nation with its decision that Olympic champion and 1964 Australian of the Year Dawn Fraser will be banned from all amateur competition for ten years. The decision follows an inquiry into Fraser's alleged misbehaviour during the 1964 Summer Olympics in Tokyo.
 August 15 – US swimmer Kenis Moore breaks the world record in the women's 200m butterfly (long course) during a meet in Maumee, Ohio, clocking 2:26.3.
 August 21 – Dutch swimming star Ada Kok breaks the world record in the women's 200m butterfly (long course) for the first time, during a meet in Leiden, clocking 2:25.8.
 September 12 – Ada Kok from the Netherlands betters her own world record in the women's 200m butterfly (long course), during a meet in Groningen, clocking 2:25.3.

Tennis
Australia
 Australian Men's Singles Championship – Roy Emerson (Australia) defeats Fred Stolle (Australia) 6–3, 6–4, 6–2
 Australian Women's Singles Championship – Margaret Smith Court (Australia) defeats Lesley Turner Bowrey (Australia) 6–3, 6–2
England
 Wimbledon Men's Singles Championship – Roy Emerson (Australia) defeats Fred Stolle (Australia) 6–4, 12–10, 4–6, 6–3
 Wimbledon Women's Singles Championship – Maria Bueno (Brazil) defeats Margaret Smith Court (Australia) 6–4, 7–9, 6–3
France
 French Men's Singles Championship – Fred Stolle (Australia) defeats Tony Roche (Australia) 3–6, 6–0, 6–2, 6–3
 French Women's Singles Championship – Lesley Turner (Australia) defeats Margaret Court (Australia) 6–3, 6–4
USA
 American Men's Singles Championship – Manuel Santana (Spain) defeats Cliff Drysdale (South Africa) 6–2, 7–9, 7–5, 6–1
 American Women's Singles Championship – Margaret Smith (Australia) defeats Billie Jean Moffitt (USA) 8–6, 7–5
Davis Cup
 1965 Davis Cup –  4–1  at White City Stadium (grass) Sydney, Australia

Multi-sport events
 First All-Africa Games held in Brazzaville, Republic of the Congo
 Fourth Pan Arab Games held in Cairo, Egypt
 Fourth Summer Universiade held in Budapest, Hungary

Awards
 ABC's Wide World of Sports Athlete of the Year: Jim Clark, Formula One champion and Indianapolis 500 winner
 Associated Press Male Athlete of the Year – Sandy Koufax, Major League Baseball
 Associated Press Female Athlete of the Year – Kathy Whitworth, LPGA golf

References

 
Sports by year